Mesomachilis is a genus of jumping bristletails in the family Machilidae. There are about six described species in Mesomachilis.

Species
 Mesomachilis californica Sturm, 1991
 Mesomachilis canadensis Sturm, 1991
 Mesomachilis leechi Sturm, 1991
 Mesomachilis mexicana Sturm, 1991
 Mesomachilis nearcticus Silvestri, 1911
 Mesomachilis strenua (Silvestri, 1911)

References

Further reading

 

insect genera